Terence John "Terry" Cowley (born 17 July 1928, in Evandale, Tasmania, died 30 January 2012 in Launceston, Tasmania) was a cricket player, who played first-class cricket for Tasmania.

He was a right-arm medium-fast bowler and he represented Tasmania in 30 first-class matches. Cowley had the honour of captaining the Tasmanian side five times in the 1960–61 and 1961–62 season, although Tasmania only managed to lose four and draw one during his captaincy.

See also
 List of Tasmanian representative cricketers

External links
Cricinfo profile

1928 births
2012 deaths
Australian cricketers
Tasmania cricketers
Cricketers from Tasmania